Froilyn Tenorio Mendoza is a Filipino civic worker and politician who is a member of the Bangsamoro Transition Authority Parliament as a representative of the Teduray people.

Background and education
Mendoza is a member of the Lambangian tribe of the Teduray and hails from South Upi, Maguindanao.

Her father was the first Teduray municipal secretary while her mother is a school teacher. While Teduray girls are usually discouraged to pursue full formal education many of which remain illiterate, Mendoza was encouraged by her parents to study and was able to finish college.

She obtained a bachelor's degree in agriculture at the University of Southern Mindanao and a second degree as a registered midwife in Northern Cotabato College.

Career
Mendoza is involved in the Bangsamoro peace process and representation of her ethnic group, the Teduray. She has served as the chair of the Teduray-Lambangian Women's Organization. She is one of the co-founders of the organization.

She has also been a member of the all-women contingent of the Civilian Protection component of the International Monitoring Team, the project manager of a special project for the advocacy of Lumad women's rights in the now defunct Autonomous Region in Muslim Mindanao (ARMM) by the United Nations Development Fund for Women and an advocacy specialist of the special project of the Institute for Autonomy and Governance for the empowerment of Indigenous Peoples in the ARMM.

Bangsamoro Transition Committee
Mendoza was appointed to the Bangsamoro Transition Commission (BTC) in 2013 by then President Benigno Aquino III. The BTC is a body which is tasked to help draft the Bangsamoro Basic Law (BBL) a charter legislation for the then-proposed autonomous Bangsamoro region intended to replace the ARMM. Mendoza was nominated by the Teduray to represent their people in the BTC. 

The first BTC under Aquino lasted from 2013 to 2014, when the body was able to come up with a draft. Mendoza signed the draft with reservations since the proposed measure did not include the recognition of the Indigenous People's Rights Act within the BBL and only included mention of an "ancestral domain" rather than "ancestral domains".

Bangsamoro Parliament
Mendoza was appointed to the Bangsamoro Transition Authority Parliament by President Bongbong Marcos on August 12, 2022. She is among the seven new woman appointees to the parliament. A nominee of the Philippine national government, Mendoza represents the Non-Moro Indigenous Peoples (NMIP) in the regional legislature.

References

Members of the Bangsamoro Transition Authority Parliament
People from Maguindanao
Living people
Year of birth missing (living people)
Teduray people
21st-century Filipino politicians
21st-century Filipino women politicians